Mark Francis (born in London, England) was an English-American soccer midfielder who played in the American Soccer League, American Indoor Soccer Association, SISL and USISL.  He has also coached at the high school, college and professional levels.  He is currently the women's head coach of the University of Kansas.

Player

Youth
Francis attended Southern Methodist University, playing on the men's soccer team from 1983 to 1987.  During his four seasons, he was a three time All American, second team in 1984, third team in 1985 and first team in 1986.  He graduated from SMU in 1987 with a bachelor's degree in physical education.

Professional
In 1988, Francis signed with the Orlando Lions of the American Soccer League, remaining with them through the 1989 season.  In the fall of 1989, he joined the Dayton Dynamo of the American Indoor Soccer Association.  The Dayton Dynamo lost to the Canton Invaders in the championship series. In 1990, he then moved to the Richardson Rockets for the SISL summer indoor soccer season.  He continued to play for the Rockets until 1992.  In 1991, the SISL was renamed the USISL and the Rockets became the North Texas Mid-Cities Flyers.  During this time, the Rockets/Flyers alternated between summer indoor and winter outdoor seasons.  The Rockets won the 1991 SISL outdoor season.  In 1993, Francis moved to the DFW Toros before returning to the Flyers, now known as the Dallas Rockets in 1993. In 1995, Francis moved again, this time to the Mesquite Kickers for the USISL Indoor season before finishing his playing career with the Mobile Revellers.

Coach
Francis began his coaching career will playing for the Dallas Rockets.  In 1991, he was hired as the girls’ soccer coach at Highland Park High School.  Over six seasons, he won two Texas State high school championships.  In 1995 while still at Highland Park, he began a woman's team at Brookhaven College.   In 1996, Francis moved to the University of South Alabama to become the women's soccer coach.  In his three seasons, he took the Jaguars to a 33-25-1 record.  His worst season was his first as the team finished 2-17.  By 1998, he had built the Jaguars into a 13-5 team, being named the Big South Conference Coach of the Year.   In 1997, Francis also served as the head coach of the Mobile Revellers while also playing for the team.  In 1999, the University of Kansas hired Francis as its women's soccer coach, a position he holds today. Francis has led Kansas to three NCAA Tournaments, and won the Big 12 in 2004.

References

External links
 Kansas Jayhawks coaching profile

1960 births
Living people
All-American men's college soccer players
American Indoor Soccer Association players
American soccer coaches
American soccer players
American Soccer League (1988–89) players
Dallas Rockets players
Dayton Dynamo players
Kansas Jayhawks women's soccer coaches
Mesquite Kickers players
South Alabama Jaguars women's soccer coaches
English emigrants to the United States
Orlando Lions players
SMU Mustangs men's soccer players
USISL players
Association football midfielders